The TIGER domain is a minor membraneless organelle in which messenger RNA (mRNA) encodes certain types of proteins to find the appropriate environment for growth. It is closely associated with the endoplasmic reticulum during protein synthesis. The TIGER domain was first documented by cell biologists Christine Mayr and Weirui Ma at the Gerstner Sloan Kettering Graduate School of Biomedical Sciences in 2018.

The letters TIG stand for TIS granules and letters ER stands for the endoplasmic reticulum. TIS granules form a network of interconnected proteins that bind RNA and the endoplasmic reticulum is where protein synthesis occurs. This combination of the TIS proteins and the endoplasmic reticulum creates a distinct place in which mRNA and proteins collect, interact, and grow. The striped pattern of the TIS granules that are interweaving with the endoplasmic reticulum also resemble the orange and black stripes of a tiger. The TIGER domain has been found in all types of cells scientists have looked at so far.

References 

Organelles

oi;popk\][u]